Battle of Stirling may refer to:

Battle of Stirling Bridge, battle of the First War of Scottish Independence in 1297
Battle of Stirling (1648), battle of the Scottish Civil War of the 17th century